Risto is a 2011 Finnish comedy film directed by Tuomas Summanen.

Cast
 Risto Kaskilahti as Risto
 Krista Kosonen as Anna
 Aku Hirviniemi as Pasi G. Happonen
 Elena Leeve as Inka
 Jarkko Niemi as Akseli
 Mika Nuojua as Tuukka
 Jaakko Saariluoma as Erik
 Ville Myllyrinne as Lahnajärvi
 Jussi Vatanen as Agentti
 Elina Knihtilä as Pankinjohtaja
 Kari Ketonen as Apulaisohjaaja
 Joanna Haartti as Ala-asteen opettaja

References

External links
 

2011 films
2011 comedy films
2010s Finnish-language films
Finnish comedy films